Rouzer may refer to:

Rouzer, West Virginia, a community in Clay County
David Rouzer, an American politician